Jamie Doran (born 8 December 1994) is an English professional rugby league footballer who plays as a  or  for Whitehaven R.L.F.C. in RFL Championship.

Career

Wigan Warriors
Whitehaven born Doran made his professional début for Super League club Wigan on 27 June 2014 against local rivals St. Helens.

Workington Town
During 2015, Doran was loaned to Workington Town of the Championship and played 27 times for the club before making the move permanent on 11 September 2015, signing a two-year deal. He played a further two games for the club that season bringing his total for the season up to 29. During the season, Doran scored three tries and also contributed with 2 drop goals.

In 2017, Doran capped a strong (League 1) season by being voted player of the year 2017. In 2018, he played a key role in Workington Town securing a playoff spot at the conclusion of the 2018 season. The hard grafting and tough scrum-half, ever present in both attack and defense.

Whitehaven
After eight years of notable service to Workington Town their captain Jamie Doran signed for his home-town club Whitehaven after nearly a decade in the professional ranks.

References

External links
Workington Town profile

1994 births
Living people
Cumbria rugby league team players
English rugby league players
Rugby league hookers
Rugby league halfbacks
Rugby league players from Whitehaven
Whitehaven R.L.F.C. players
Wigan Warriors players
Workington Town players